The Melville Millionaires are a Canadian junior "A" ice hockey based in Melville, Saskatchewan.  They are members of the Saskatchewan Junior Hockey League (SJHL).  They play their home games in the Horizon Credit Union Centre which has a seating capacity of 2,100. The Melville Millionaires and the Yorkton Terriers are archrivals. The team colours are blue and white. Games are broadcast on radio station CJGX AM 940. The Millionaires also fielded a senior hockey team in the 1910s, which won the 1915 Allan Cup.

History

An earlier edition of the Melville Millionaires played senior hockey during the 1910s in the Southern Saskatchewan Hockey League, winning the league championship in 1915 and taking over the title of Allan Cup champions. The team subsequently won two challenges but lost the final challenge of the season to the Winnipeg Monarchs.
 
Future National Hockey League all-star Ron Hextall was a member of the Millionaires during the 1980–81 season.  On February 27, 1981, Hextall faced 105 shots against the five-time league champion Prince Albert Raiders in a 21–2 loss.  The game reporter said "Hextall was Brilliant..." through his 84-save effort, claiming the "score could have gone up to 34 or 35."

Season-by-season standings

Playoffs
1971 Lost Semi-final
Weyburn Red Wings defeated Melville Millionaires 4-games-to-2
1972 Lost Final
Melville Millionaires defeated Regina Blues 4-games-to-none
Melville Millionaires defeated Prince Albert Raiders 4-games-to-2
Humboldt Broncos defeated Melville Millionaires 4-games-to-1
1973 Lost Quarter-final
Humboldt Broncos defeated Melville Millionaires 4-games-to-2
1974 DNQ
1975 Lost Quarter-final
Battleford Barons defeated Melville Millionaires 4-games-to-2
1976 Lost Semi-final
Melville Millionaires defeated Estevan Bruins 4-games-to-3
Weyburn Red Wings defeated Melville Millionaires 4-games-to-2
1977 Lost Final
Melville Millionaires defeated Moose Jaw Canucks 4-games-to-2
Melville Millionaires defeated Weyburn Red Wings 4-games-to-1
Prince Albert Raiders defeated Melville Millionaires 4-games-to-21978 DNQ1979 Lost Semi-finalMelville Millionaires defeated Weyburn Red Wings 4-games-to-3Moose Jaw Canucks defeated Melville Millionaires 4-games-to-none1980 Lost Quarter-finalMoose Jaw Canucks defeated Melville Millionaires 4-games-to-11981 DNQ1982 Lost Quarter-finalYorkton Terriers defeated Melville Millionaires 4-games-to-none1983 Lost Semi-finalMelville Millionaires defeated Swift Current Broncos 4-games-to-none 
Yorkton Terriers defeated Melville Millionaires 4-games-to-1 
1984 Lost Semi-finalMelville Millionaires defeated Estevan Bruins 4-games-to-1Weyburn Red Wings defeated Melville Millionaires 4-games-to-31985 Lost Quarter-finalBattlefords North Stars defeated Melville Millionaires 4-games-to-31986 Lost Quarter-finalEstevan Bruins defeated Melville Millionaires 4-games-to-none1987 Lost Quarter-finalHumboldt Broncos defeated Melville Millionaires 4-games-to-11988 Lost Quarter-finalYorkton Terriers defeated Melville Millionaires 4-games-to-11989 DNQ1990 Lost Quarter-finalHumboldt Broncos defeated Melville Millionaires 4-games-to-11991 Lost Quarter-finalWeyburn Red Wings defeated Melville Millionaires 4-games-to-31992 Lost Semi-finalMelville Millionaires defeated Weyburn Red Wings 4-games-to-2Estevan Bruins defeated Melville Millionaires 4-games-to-11993 Lost FinalMelville Millionaires defeated Weyburn Red Wings 4-games-to-noneMelville Millionaires defeated Estevan Bruins 4-games-to-1Flin Flon Bombers defeated Melville Millionaires 4-games-to-31994 Lost Semi-finalMelville Millionaires defeated Yorkton Terriers 4-games-to-noneWeyburn Red Wings defeated Melville Millionaires 4-games-to-21995 Lost PreliminaryEstevan Bruins defeated Melville Millionaires 2-games-to-none1996 DNQ1997 DNQ1998 Lost PreliminaryNotre Dame Hounds defeated Melville Millionaires 2-games-to-11999 Lost Quarter-finalMelville Millionaires defeated Lebret Eagles 2-games-to-noneEstevan Bruins defeated Melville Millionaires 4-games-to-none2000 Lost Semi-finalSecond in round robin (3-1) vs. Notre Dame Hounds and La Ronge Ice Wolves
Melville Millionaires defeated Estevan Bruins 4-games-to-1Weyburn Red Wings defeated Melville Millionaires 4-games-to-22001 Lost Quarter-finalLebret Eagles defeated Melville Millionaires 4-games-to-22002 DNQ2003 Lost FinalMelville Millionaires defeated Notre Dame Hounds 4-games-to-2Melville Millionaires defeated Yorkton Terriers 4-games-to-2Humboldt Broncos defeated Melville Millionaires 4-games-to-none2004 Lost Quarter-finalYorkton Terriers defeated Melville Millionaires 4-games-to-22005 DNQ2006 Lost Quarter-finalThird in round robin (1-2-1) vs. Notre Dame Hounds and Yorkton Terriers
Notre Dame Hounds defeated Melville Millionaires 4-games-to-none2007 Lost FinalFirst in round robin (3-0-1) vs. Estevan Bruins and Yorkton Terriers
Melville Millionaires defeated Weyburn Red Wings 4-games-to-2Melville Millionaires defeated Yorkton Terriers 4-games-to-3Humboldt Broncos defeated Melville Millionaires 4-games-to-12008 Lost Semi-finalFirst in round robin (2-0-1) vs. Kindersley Klippers and Weyburn Red Wings
Melville Millionaires defeated Yorkton Terriers 4-games-to-noneKindersley Klippers defeated Melville Millionaires 4-games-to-22009 Lost FinalMelville Millionaires defeated Yorkton Terriers 4-games-to-3Melville Millionaires defeated Weyburn Red Wings 4-games-to-2Humboldt Broncos defeated Melville Millionaires 4-games-to-12010 Lost PreliminaryYorkton Terriers defeated Melville Millionaires 3-games-to-12011 Lost PreliminaryEstevan Bruins defeated Melville Millionaires 3-games-to-22012 Lost Semi-FinalQuarter Finals Melville Millionaires defeated Yorkton Terriers 4-games-to-1Semi-Finals Weyburn Red Wings defeated Melville Millionaires 4-games-to-32013 Lost Semi-FinalQuarter Finals Melville Millionaires defeated Notre Dame Hounds 4-games-to-3Semi-Finals Yorkton Terriers defeated Melville Millionaires 4-games-to-22014 Lost FinalsQuarter Finals Melville Millionaires defeated Kindersley Klippers 4-games-to-noneSemi-Finals Melville Millionaires defeated Battlefords North Stars 4-games-to-1Finals Yorkton Terriers defeated Melville Millionaires 4-games-to-none''

Notable NHL alumni

 Wade Brookbank
 Tim Cheveldae
 Brett Clark
 Wilf Cude
 Mike Eagles
 John Ferguson Sr.
 Bill Flett
 Shaun Heshka
 Ron Hextall
 Jim Hiller
 Chris Kunitz
 Brian Propp
 Eddie Shore
 Richard Zemlak

Notable Olympian alumni
 Ted Hargreaves - Bronze medalist, Canadian men's national hockey team, 1968 Winter Olympics

See also
 List of ice hockey teams in Saskatchewan

References

External links 
Melville Millionaires home page

Saskatchewan Junior Hockey League teams
Melville, Saskatchewan